Yūichi Sugita was the defending champion but lost in the second round to Colin Sinclair.

Yosuke Watanuki won the title after defeating Frederico Ferreira Silva 6–2, 6–2 in the final.

Seeds

Draw

Finals

Top half

Bottom half

References

External links
Main draw
Qualifying draw

Yokkaichi Challenger - 1